New Meadows is a rural city in Adams County, Idaho, United States, at the southern and upper end of the Meadows Valley, on the Little Salmon River. Located in the west central part of the state, just south of the 45th parallel, the population was 496 at the 2010 census, down from 533 in 2000. New Meadows is located at the junction of the primary north–south highway in the state, U.S. Route 95, and State Highway 55, which connects it with McCall and Boise.

History

Meadows was in Washington County before Adams County was established in 1911. The Meadows Eagle was newspaper serving the community. C. A. Hackney was the publisher.

The city of New Meadows hosts the last surviving PIN. Without the Pacific and Idaho Northern Railroad, New Meadows would arguably not have existed.

The depot was built in 1910 and served as the northern end of the PIN Railroad. It is a significant cultural and historical resource in the Payette River Scenic Byway corridor in the city of New Meadows, at the junction of US-95 and state highway 55. It is listed on the National Register of Historic Places. The depot is an asset for the community of New Meadows and currently functions as a community center for the local area. It hosted the Barn Again! Smithsonian Institution traveling exhibition in 2005, and represents early twentieth century efforts to create a north–south railroad for Idaho. Though the efforts ultimately failed, the PIN Railroad served an important function as a "farm-to-market" railroad until 1940, and then as a timber railroad for local timber outfits.

The Union Pacific acquired the line in 1936 and in 1979 abandoned the northern end of the line, from the Tamarack sawmill site north of Council to New Meadows, along US-95. The depot was a functioning facility until 1972. In 1978, ACHS acquired the title to the PIN Depot to preserve it as a repository for the history of Adams County.
Since 2000, the building has been preserved from immediate deterioration. The foundation has been restored and the building now has a new roof.

Education
The only school in New Meadows is the Meadows Valley School, which houses all thirteen grades, K-12. The school mascot is the mountaineer, and the school colors are orange and black.

Recreation
The MeadowCreek golf resort (originally "Kimberland Meadows") is a few miles northwest of town. Payette Lake and the surrounding areas in McCall offer numerous recreational opportunities, and further north along US-95 is Riggins, the gateway to the Salmon River and the Seven Devils Mountains.  north of New Meadows is Zim's Hot Springs.

Highways
 - U.S. Route 95
 - State Highway 55 - Payette River Scenic Byway

It heads north from Eagle in Ada County to Horseshoe Bend in Boise County, and climbs the whitewater of the Payette River to Cascade and McCall in Valley County. The route turns west at Payette Lake in McCall and ends at New Meadows at the junction with U.S. Route 95.

Geography

Demographics

2010 census
As of the census of 2010, there were 496 people, 201 households, and 136 families residing in the city. The racial makeup of the city was 95.4% White, 0.4% Native American, 3.2% from other races, and 1.0% from two or more races. Hispanic or Latino of any race were 4.8% of the population.

There were 201 households, of which 34.3% had children under the age of 18 living with them, 51.2% were married couples living together, 10.0% had a female householder with no husband present, 6.5% had a male householder with no wife present, and 32.3% were non-families. 24.9% of all households were made up of individuals, and 7% had someone living alone who was 65 years of age or older. The average household size was 2.46 and the average family size was 2.91.

The median age in the city was 35.9 years. 27.2% of residents were under the age of 18; 8.1% were between the ages of 18 and 24; 25.4% were from 25 to 44; 28.5% were from 45 to 64; and 10.9% were 65 years of age or older. The gender makeup of the city was 51.2% male and 48.8% female.

2000 census
As of the census of 2000, there were 533 people, 208 households, and 143 families residing in the city. The racial makeup of the city was 97.19% White, 0.19% African American, 1.31% Native American, 0.38% from other races, and 0.94% from two or more races. Hispanic or Latino of any race were 0.75% of the population.

There were 208 households, out of which 34.6% had children under the age of 18 living with them, 57.7% were married couples living together, 7.7% had a female householder with no husband present, and 30.8% were non-families. 24.5% of all households were made up of individuals, and 7.2% had someone living alone who was 65 years of age or older. The average household size was 2.56 and the average family size was 3.08.

In the city, the population was spread out, with 29.1% under the age of 18, 6.2% from 18 to 24, 30.8% from 25 to 44, 24.0% from 45 to 64, and 9.9% who were 65 years of age or older. The median age was 36 years. For every 100 females, there were 159.5 males. For every 100 females age 18 and over, there were 140.1 males.

The median income for a household in the city was $28,500, and the median income for a family was $31,042. Males had a median income of $30,000 versus $14,500 for females. The per capita income for the city was $11,884. About 16.2% of families and 16.4% of the population were below the poverty line, including 14.8% of those under age 18 and 5.0% of those age 65 or over.

Residents
Gilbert F. Smith, state legislator and president of Meadows Valley Bank

See also
Pacific and Idaho Northern Railroad Depot
National Register of Historic Places listings in Adams County, Idaho

References

External links
 
 Meadows Valley Chamber of Commerce
 Meadows Valley School District
 Historic PIN Railroad Depot
 Visit Southwest Idaho - New Meadows
 University of Idaho Library – vintage postcard of Meadows Valley Hotel

Cities in Adams County, Idaho
Cities in Idaho